A superheater is a device used to convert saturated steam or wet steam into superheated steam or dry steam. Superheated steam is used in steam turbines for electricity generation, steam engines, and in processes such as steam reforming. There are three types of superheaters: radiant, convection, and separately fired. A superheater can vary in size from a few tens of feet to several hundred feet (a few metres to some hundred metres).

Types 
 A radiant superheater is placed directly in radiant zone of the combustion chamber near the water wall so as to absorb heat by radiation.
 A convection superheater is located in the convective zone of the furnace usually ahead of economizer (in the path of the hot flue gases). These are also called primary superheaters.
 A separately fired superheater is a superheater that is placed outside the main boiler, which has its own separate combustion system. This superheater design incorporates additional burners in the area of superheater pipes. This type of superheater is rarely if ever used, because of poor efficiency and steam quality that is not better than other superheater types.

Steam turbines

Steam engines 
In a steam engine, the superheater re-heats the steam generated by the boiler, increasing its thermal energy and decreasing the likelihood that it will condense inside the engine. Superheaters increase the thermal efficiency of the steam engine, and have been widely adopted.  Steam which has been superheated is logically known as superheated steam; non-superheated steam is called saturated steam or wet steam.  Superheaters were applied to steam locomotives in quantity from the early 20th century, to most steam vehicles, and to stationary steam engines. This equipment is still used in conjunction with steam turbines in electrical power generating stations throughout the world.

Locomotives 

In steam locomotive use, by far the most common form of superheater is the fire-tube type.  This takes the saturated steam supplied in the dry pipe into a superheater header mounted against the tube sheet in the smokebox.  The steam is then passed through a number of superheater elements—long pipes which are placed inside large diameter fire tubes, called flues.  Hot combustion gases from the locomotive's fire pass through these flues just like they do the firetubes, and as well as heating the water they also heat the steam inside the superheater elements they flow over.  The superheater element doubles back on itself so that the heated steam can return; most do this twice at the fire end and once at the smokebox end, so that the steam travels a distance of four times the header's length while being heated.  The superheated steam, at the end of its journey through the elements, passes into a separate compartment of the superheater header and then to the cylinders as normal.

Damper and snifting valve 
The steam passing through the superheater elements cools their metal and prevents them from melting, but when the throttle closes this cooling effect is absent, and thus a damper closes in the smokebox to  cut off the flow through the flues and prevent them being damaged.  Some locomotives (particularly on the London and North Eastern Railway) were fitted with snifting valves which admitted air to the superheater when the locomotive was coasting. This kept the superheater elements cool and the cylinders warm.  The snifting valve can be seen behind the chimney on many LNER locomotives.

Front-end throttle 
A superheater increases the distance between the throttle and the cylinders in the steam circuit and thus reduces the immediacy of throttle action.  To counteract this, some later steam locomotives were fitted with a front-end throttle placed in the smokebox after the superheater.  Such locomotives can sometimes be identified by an external throttle rod that stretches the whole length of the boiler, with a crank on the outside of the smokebox.  This arrangement also allows superheated steam to be used for auxiliary appliances, such as the dynamo and air pumps. Another benefit of the front-end throttle is that superheated steam is immediately available. With a dome throttle, it took quite some time before the super heater actually provided benefits in efficiency.

Cylinder valves 
Locomotives with superheaters are usually fitted with piston valves or poppet valves.  This is because it is difficult to keep a slide valve properly lubricated at high temperature.

Applications 

The first practical superheater was developed in Germany by Wilhelm Schmidt during the 1880s and 1890s. The first superheated locomotive Prussian S 4 series, with an early form of superheater, was built in 1898, and produced in series from 1902. The benefits of the invention were demonstrated in the UK by the Great Western Railway (GWR) in 1906. The GWR Chief Mechanical Engineer, G. J. Churchward believed, however, that the Schmidt type could be bettered, and design and testing of an indigenous Swindon type was undertaken, culminating in the Swindon No. 3 superheater in 1909. Douglas Earle Marsh carried out a series of comparative tests between members of his I3 class using saturated steam and those fitted with the Schmidt superheater between October 1907 and March 1910, proving the advantages of the latter in terms of performance and efficiency.

Other improved superheaters were introduced by John G. Robinson of the Great Central Railway at Gorton locomotive works, by Robert Urie of the London and South Western Railway (LSWR) at Eastleigh railway works, and Richard Maunsell of the Southern Railway (Great Britain), also at Eastleigh.

The oldest surviving steam locomotives with a superheater and the first narrow gauge locomotive with a superheater is the Bh.1 owned by the STLB and runs excursions trains on the Mur Valley Railroad in Austria.

Urie's "Eastleigh" superheater 

Robert Urie's design of superheater for the LSWR was the product of experience with his H15 class 4-6-0 locomotives. In anticipation of performance trials, eight examples were fitted with Schmidt and Robinson superheaters, and two others remained saturated. However, the First World War intervened before the trials could take place, although an LSWR Locomotive Committee report from late 1915 noted that the Robinson version gave the best fuel efficiency.

However, the report stated that both superheater types had serious drawbacks, with the Schmidt system featuring a damper control on the superheater header that caused hot gases to condense into sulphuric acid, which caused pitting and subsequent weakening of the superheater elements. Leakage of gases was also commonplace between the elements and the header, and maintenance was difficult without removal of the horizontally-arranged assembly. The Robinson version suffered from temperature variations caused by saturated and superheated steam chambers being adjacent, causing material stress, and had similar access problems as the Schmidt type.

The report's recommendations enabled Urie to design a new type of superheater with separate saturated steam headers above and below the superheater header. These were connected by elements beginning at the saturated header, running through the flue tubes and back to the superheater header, and the whole assembly was vertically arranged for ease of maintenance. The device was highly successful in service, but was heavy and expensive to construct.

Advantages and disadvantages 
The main advantages of using a superheater are reduced fuel and water consumption but there is a price to pay in increased maintenance costs.  In most cases the benefits outweighed the costs and superheaters were widely used.  An exception was shunting locomotives  (switchers). British shunting locomotives were rarely fitted with superheaters.  In locomotives used for mineral traffic the advantages seem to have been marginal.  For example, the North Eastern Railway fitted superheaters to some of its NER Class P mineral locomotives but later began to remove them.

Without careful maintenance superheaters are prone to a particular type of hazardous failure in the tube bursting at the U-shaped turns in the superheater tube. This is difficult to both manufacture, and test when installed, and a rupture will cause the superheated high-pressure steam to escape immediately into the large flues, then back to the fire and into the cab, to the extreme danger of the locomotive crew.

References

Bibliography 
 
 

Boilers
Steam boiler components
Locomotive parts